Shipilov is a Russian masculine surname, its feminine counterpart is Shipilova. It may refer to
Anton Shipilov (born 1973), Russian football coach and former player
Natalya Shipilova (born 1979), Russian handball player
Vladimir Shipilov (born 1972), Russian football player

Russian-language surnames